The year 2018 is the seventh year in the history of the Glory, an international kickboxing promotion. The year started with Glory 50: Chicago. The events are broadcasts through television agreements with ESPN, Fight Network, and other regional channels around the world.

Glory 2018 Awards 
The following fighters won the GLORY Kickboxing year-end awards for 2018:
Glory Fighter of the Year 2018: Sitthichai Sitsongpeenong
Glory Fight of the Year 2018: Benjamin Adegbuyi vs. Jahfarr Wilnis 
Glory Knockout of the Year 2018: Petchpanomrung Kiatmookao vs. Abdellah Ezbiri 
Glory Newcomer of the Year 2018: Asa Ten Pow

List of events

Glory 50: Chicago

Glory 50: Chicago was a kickboxing event held by Glory on February 16, 2018, at the UIC Pavilion in Chicago, Illinois, US.

Background
This event featured a trilogy fight for the Glory Welterweight Championship between the champion Murthel Groenhart and Harut Grigorian as headliner.

This event also featured a 4-Man Heavyweight Contender Tournament to earn a shot for a Glory Championship.

The GLORY 50 SuperFight Series co-headline bout was originally scheduled to be a rematch between heavyweights Cătălin Moroșanu and Giannis Stoforidis. An injury to Moroșanu forced him from the card.

Anthony McDonald pulled from his fight against Haze Wilson due to high blood pressure.

Due to a cut suffered in the semi-finals Guto was unable to fight in the finals. Junior Tafa stepped in to face Benjamin Adegbuyi.

Results

2018 Glory Heavyweight Contender Tournament bracket

Glory 51: Rotterdam

Glory 51: Rotterdam "Bad Blood" was a kickboxing event held on March 3, 2018, at Rotterdam Ahoy in Rotterdam, Netherlands.

Background
The event featured the long-awaited rematch between the champion Badr Hari and Hesdy Gerges as Glory 51 headliner and a number one contender fight between Alim Nabiev and the former Glory Welterweight Champion Cedric Doumbe as Superfight Series headliner.

This event also featured a 4-Man Welterweight Contender Tournament to earn a shot at the Glory Welterweight Championship.

Results

2018 Glory Welterweight Contender Tournament bracket

Glory 52: Los Angeles

Glory 52: Los Angeles was a kickboxing event held on March 31, 2018, at the Long Beach Arena in Los Angeles, California, US.

Background
The GLORY 52 co-main event bout was originally scheduled to be match between Lightweights Marat Grigorian and Stoyan Koprivlenski. Grigorian had to withdraw due to a neck injury, whilst Koprivlenski took on Josh Jauncey instead.

Robert Thomas suffered a concussion during training and was forced to withdraw from Glory Middleweight Contender Tournament. Following this shake-up, the remaining three middleweight tournament contenders were rebooked.

Simon Marcus remained on the card, and met Zack Wells in the Glory 52 co-headline bout.

Yousri Belgaroui and Jason Wilnis were originally scheduled to compete in the middleweight contender tournament, but instead squared off as part of Glory 53 SuperFight Series from Lille, France.

Bonus awards:
 
The following fighter has been awarded $5,000 bonus:
Performance of the Night: Josh Jauncey

Results

Glory 53: Lille

Glory 53: Lille was a kickboxing event held on May 12, 2018, at the Zénith de Lille in Lille, France.

Background
Eyevan Danenberg suffered an injury during training and was forced to withdraw from his fight against Cedric Doumbe. Thongchai Sitsongpeenong stepped in to face Doumbe.

Also a severe hand injury forced Mohammed Jaraya to withdraw from his showdown with Alan Scheinson, Anghel Cardoş stepped in on a short notice to face Scheinson.

Jason Wilnis was forced to withdraw for medical reasons, Dawid Kasperski stepped in on a week's notice to take on Yousri Belgaroui.

Bonus awards:
 
The following fighter has been awarded $5,000 bonus:
Performance of the Night: Petchpanomrung Kiatmookao

Results

2018 Glory Featherweight Contender Tournament bracket

Glory 54: Birmingham

Glory 54: Birmingham was a kickboxing event held on June 2, 2018, at the Genting Arena in Birmingham, England.

Background
Bonus awards:
 
The following fighter has been awarded $5,000 bonus:
Performance of the Night: Harut Grigorian

Results

Glory 55: New York

Glory 55: New York was a kickboxing event held on July 20, 2018, at Hulu Theater in New York City, New York, US.

Background
The GLORY 55 main event bout was originally scheduled to be a rematch for the Glory Featherweight Championship between the champion Robin van Roosmalen and Petchpanomrung Kiatmookao. Van Roosmalen had to withdraw due to a shoulder injury, Kiatmookao instead fought Kevin VanNostrand for the Glory Featherweight interim-title.

Bonus awards:
 
The following fighter has been awarded $5,000 bonus:
Performance of the Night: Alex Pereira

Results

Glory 56: Denver

Glory 56: Denver was a kickboxing event held on August 10, 2018, at the 1stBank Center in Broomfield, US.

Background
This event featured two world title fights for the Glory Light Heavyweight Championship a rematch between the champion Artem Vakhitov and Danyo Ilunga and for the Glory Women's Super Bantamweight Championship between the champion Anissa Meksen and Jady Menezes.

Results

Glory 57: Shenzhen

Glory 57: Shenzhen was a kickboxing event held on August 25, 2018, at the Shenzhen Bay Sports Center in Shenzhen, China.

Background
Zinedine Hameur-Lain withdrew from his scheduled appearance against Felipe Micheletti, and both fighters were rebooked at a later date.

Bonus awards:
 
The following fighter has been awarded $5,000 bonus:
Performance of the Night: Liu Xu

Results

2018 Glory Lightweight Qualification Tournament bracket
{{8TeamBracket-NoSeeds
| RD1=Quarter-finals|RD2=Semi-finals| RD3=Final

| team-width=150
| score-width=20

| RD1-team1= Lei Feng 
| RD1-score1=1-4
| RD1-team2= Wensheng Zhang| RD1-score2=DEC| RD1-team3= Li Deng| RD1-score3=TKO| RD1-team4= Alimjan Tursun
| RD1-score4=1r.

| RD1-team5= Tiehan Xu  
| RD1-score5=1-4
| RD1-team6= Chao Wang| RD1-score6=DEC| RD1-team7= Liu Xu| RD1-score7=DEC| RD1-team8= Junchen Zhao
| RD1-score8=4-1

| RD2-team1= Wensheng Zhang
| RD2-score1=DEC
| RD2-team2= Li Deng
| RD2-score2=3-2

| RD2-team3= Chao Wang
| RD2-score3=0-5
| RD2-team4= Liu Xu
| RD2-score4=DEC

| RD3-team1= Wensheng Zhang
| RD3-score1=1-4
| RD3-team2= Liu Xu| RD3-score2=DEC}}

Glory 58: ChicagoGlory 58: Chicago was a kickboxing event held on September 14, 2018, at the Sears Centre in Hoffman Estates, US.

Background
The bout between welterweight Alan Scheinson and Malik Watson-Smith was canceled due to visa issues on Scheinson's part.

Troy Jones won the 4-man Welterweight Qualification Tournament as Mike Lemaire could not continue due to his injuries and Justin Moss who won earlier in the evening did not receive medical clearance to fight Jones.Bonus awards: 
The following fighter has been awarded $5,000 bonus:Performance of the Night: Alex Pereira

Results

Glory 59: AmsterdamGlory 59: Amsterdam was a kickboxing event held on September 29, 2018, at the Johan Cruyff Arena in Amsterdam, Netherlands.

BackgroundBonus awards: 
The following fighter has been awarded $5,000 bonus:Performance of the Night:Results

Glory 60: LyonGlory 60: Lyon was a kickboxing event held on October 20, 2018, at the Palais des Sports de Gerland in Lyon, France.

Background
Glory welterweight champion Harut Grigorian was unable to compete due to acute gastroenteritis that has forced him from the fight card. Therefore, Cédric Doumbé took on Muay Thai fighter Jimmy Vienot. Vienot was scheduled to fight earlier in that evening, but has seized a short notice opportunity to headline opposite the former champion. His original opponent, Dmitry Menshikov, met Samuel Dbili as part of SuperFight Series.Bonus awards: 
The following fighter has been awarded $5,000 bonus:Performance of the Night:Results

Glory 61: New YorkGlory 61: New York was a kickboxing event held on November 2, 2018, at the Hammerstein Ballroom in New York City, US.

BackgroundBonus awards: 
The following fighter has been awarded $5,000 bonus:Performance of the Night: Anissa Meksen

Results

Glory 62: RotterdamGlory 62: Rotterdam was a kickboxing event held on December 8, 2018 at Rotterdam Ahoy in Rotterdam, Netherlands.

Background
Glory's No.1-ranked heavyweight Benjamin Adegbuyi of Romania has been named the No. 1 seed in the tournament draw. Seed No. 2 has been assigned to Jamal Ben Saddik of Morocco. Heavyweight champion Rico Verhoeven talks acting career and could be stripped of belt.

On November 15, it was announced that Mohammed Jaraya had suffered a hand injury and was pulling out of his bout with Robbie Hageman. Jaraya was replaced by Dmitrii Menshikov.Bonus awards: 
The following fighters will be awarded $5,000 bonuses:Fighter of the Night:Knockout of the Night:'''

Results

Glory Heavyweight Tournament bracket

See also
2018 in Glory of Heroes
2018 in Kunlun Fight
2018 in K-1 
2018 in ONE Championship
2018 in Romanian kickboxing

References

Glory (kickboxing) events
2018 in kickboxing